The Division of City Schools–Valenzuela or simply DCS–Valenzuela is a subdivision of Department of Education mandated to supervise public and private elementary, secondary and tertiary education in Valenzuela, Metro Manila, Philippines. The current head of the Division is Dr. Melton P. Zurbano, without assistant superintendent 

The main office of DCS–Valenzuela is located in Marulas Central School Compound, Pio Valenzuela St., barangay Marulas. This office also houses the division's congressional district I's first elementary, congressional district II's first elementary and high school district offices. On the other hand, district office for congressional district I's second elementary is within the Andres Fernando Elementary School compound in barangay Malanday; congressional district II's second elementary school district is in Gen. T. de Leon Elementary School compound.

The city government prides itself in giving free education to its quality free education to its constituents through its primary, secondary and tertiary schools.

District offices
DCS–Valenzuela has two district offices in each congressional districts in elementary level and a coordinating office for the high school level:

 Elementary level
 Congressional district I:
Malinta Elementary School compound, Malinta
Andres Fernando (A. Fernando) Elementary School compound, Malanday
Congressional district II:
Gen. T. de Leon Elementary School compound, Gen. T. de Leon
Marulas Elementary School compound (main office), Marulas
 Secondary level
Congressional district I:
Malinta Elementary School compound, Malinta
Congressional district II:
Malinta Elementary School compound, Malinta

Schools division superintendent
The schools division superintendent is the highest policy-maker of the division. He coordinates with the city mayor to implement education projects.

Timeline

Government-owned schools

Primary/Elementary schools

Andres Fernando Elementary School (Malanday)
Andres Mariano Elementary School (Bagbaguin)
Antonio M. Serapio Elementary School (Ugong-Gen. T. de Leon)
Apolonia F. Rafael Elementary School (Mapulang Lupa)
Arcadio F. Deato Elementary School (Balangkas)
Bitik Elementary School (Marulas)
Canumay East Elementary School
Canumay West Elementary School
Caruhatan East Elementary School
Caruhatan West Elementary School
Coloong Elementary School
Constantino Elementary School (Marulas)
Dalandanan Elementary School
Disiplina Village Bignay Elementary School
Doña Ata Elementary School (Marulas)
Gen. T. De Leon Elementary School
Isla Elementary School
Lawang Bato Elementary School
Lingunan Elementary School
Luis Francisco Elementary School (Veinte Reales)
Malinta Elementary School
Marulas Central School
Maysan Elementary School
Paltok Elementary School (Veinte Reales)
Parada Elementary School
Paso De Blas Elementary School
Pasolo Elementary School
Perpetua R. San Diego Elementary School (Arkong Bato)
Pio Valenzuela Elementary School (Palasan)
Punturin Elementary School
Punturin I Elementary School
Rincon Elementary School
Roberta De Jesus Elementary School (Bignay)
San Miguel Heights Elementary School (Marulas)
Santiago A. De Guzman Elementary School (Gen. T. de Leon)
Santos Encarnacion Elementary School (Dalandanan)
Serrano Elementary School (Marulas)
Silvestre Lazaro Elementary School (Ugong)
Sito Sto. Rosario Elementary School (Maysan)
Tagalag Elementary School
Wawang Pulo Elementary School

Secondary/High schools

Arkong Bato National High School
Bagbaguin National High School
Bignay National High School
Bignay National High School - Disiplina Village Annex
Caruhatan National High School
Canumay East National High School
Canumay West National High School
Dalandanan National High School
Gen. T. De Leon National High School
Justice Eliezer R. Delos Santos National High School (Ugong)
Lawang Bato National High School
Lingunan National High School
Malinta National High School
Mapulang Lupa National High School
Maysan National High School
Parada National High School
Paso De Blas National High School
Polo National High School (Palasan)
Polo National High School - Malanday Annex
Sitero Francisco Memorial National High School (Ugong)
Valenzuela City School of Mathematics and Science (Malinta)
Valenzuela National High School (Marulas)
Veinte Reales National High School
Vicente P. Trinidad National High School (Punturin)
Wawang Pulo National High School

Private schools

 Angel's Haven Learning Center
 Bible Institute for Deaf
 Bobby and Kates Montessori, Inc.
 Bright Hope School, Inc.
 Charis Christian School of Valenzuela
 Charisma Christian School for Children Inc.
 Children of Mary Immaculate College
 Christ's Agape School of Valenzuela
 Christ's Ambassador Christian Academy
 Colegio De Sta. Cecilia
 Colegio Sto. Niño de Valenzuela
 Corinthian School, Inc.
 Divine World Learning Center
 Emmaus Christian School, Inc.
 High Horizons Learning Center
 Jeremiah Christian Academy of Malinta, Inc.
 Jesus is Lord Christian Foundation, Inc.
 Jesus Our Life Christian Academy
 Jireh Miracle Jose Academy, Inc.
 John Vincent School
 Juliever Academy
 La Consolacion College - Valenzuela (formerly known as St. Jude Academy)
 Little Bethlehem Learning Center
 Lord Jesus Christ Christian Academe, Inc.
 Marisyl School, Inc.
 Marulas Christian School, Inc.
 Marulas Valenzuela Learning Center, Inc.
 Mary and Child Valenzuela Learning Center
 Mary Imaculate Learning Center of Valenzuela
 Messiah School Foundation, Inc.
 Milk and Honey Learning Center
 Monteras Learning Center, Inc.
 Montessori Academy of Valenzuela, Inc.
 Montevilla School, Inc.
 Mother Shepherd Montessori School of Valenzuela
 New Prodon Academy of Valenzuela
 Nuestra Señora de Guia Academy
 Our Lady of Angels Learning Center, Inc.
 Our Lady of Fatima University
 Our Lady of Lourdes College
 Our Lord's Vineyard School
 P. Angel's Hope Academy
 Parafort Child Study Center Development
 Paragon Academy, Inc.
 PE Jesus Cares Christian School
 Peña Educational Center
 Philippine School for Technology Development and Innovation Inc.
 Philippine Faith Academy
 Philippine Ling-Liang Christian Academy
 Polycalm Academy
 Rosewood Montessori International School of Valenzuela, Inc.
 Saint Louis College Valenzuela
 Saint Mary Montessori Center
 Saint Mary's Angels College of Valenzuela
 San Diego Parochial School
 SKM Christian Academy, Inc.
 St. Bernadette College of Valenzuela
 St. Blaise Learning Center of Valenzuela
 St. Catherine School
 St. Didacus School Inc.
 St. Gregory College of Valenzuela
 St. Joseph Academy of Valenzuela
 St. Joseph School of Lawang Bato, Inc.
 St. Leonore Learning Center
 St. Michael Academy–Malinta
 St. Michael Academy–Bagbaguin
 St. Michael School of Canumay
 St. Nick Learning Center
 St. Paul Christian School, Inc.
 St. Therese of Child Jesus Academy of Ugong Valenzuela, Inc.
 St. Therese of the Child Jesus Kids Academy
 Sto. Rosario Montessori School
 Ten Commandments Child Development Center
 Valenzuela Christian School
 VUMC-Ecumenical Development School, Inc.
 Westleyan Kindergarten School
 Wisdom Jade Christian School
 Words of Wisdom Christian Academy
 Wrimare School Inc.

Colleges and universities

Bethel Bible College
Biblical Seminary of the Philippines
Children of Mary Immaculate College
Datamex Institute of Computer Technology
Fatima College of Medicine
Fatima Medical Science Foundation, Inc.
FEBIAS College of Bible
Our Lady of Fatima University
Pamantasan ng Lungsod ng Valenzuela
La Consolacion College - Valenzuela (formerly known as St. Jude Academy)
Our Lady of Lourdes College
St. Judel Institute of Technology
St. Louis College
Sta. Cecilia College
Valenzuela City Polytechnic College

Notes

External links

Division of City Schools–Valenzuela
Department of Education, Philippines

Department of Education (Philippines)
Schools in Valenzuela, Metro Manila
Articles which contain graphical timelines
Educational institutions established in 1994
1994 establishments in the Philippines